Dominik Piła (born 6 May 2001) is a Polish professional footballer who plays as a winger for Lechia Gdańsk.

Club career
Piła started his professional career with Polish I liga side Chrobry Głogów in 2019. On 4 January 2022, he signed a four-year contract with Ekstraklasa club Lechia Gdańsk, effective from 1 July 2022.

Career statistics

Club

References

External links

2001 births
Living people
People from Świdnica
Polish footballers
Association football wingers
Chrobry Głogów players
Lechia Gdańsk players
I liga players
Ekstraklasa players
Poland youth international footballers